The Complete Trio Collection is compilation album by American singer-songwriters Dolly Parton, Emmylou Harris and Linda Ronstadt. It brings together newly remastered versions of their two award-winning albums, 1987's Trio and 1999's Trio II, with a third disc compiling 20 alternate takes and unreleased material. It was released worldwide on September 9, 2016, by Rhino Entertainment. A stand-alone version of the third disc, titled Farther Along, was released separately on vinyl.

Despite being touted as "complete", the set is missing three recordings that feature the trio. Those three tracks are:
 "Light of the Stable" – recorded and released as a single in 1975 featuring additional harmony vocals from Neil Young, it was also included on Harris' 1979 album of the same name.
 "Evangeline"  – recorded in 1978 and featured on Harris' 1981 album of the same name, along with "Mr. Sandman", which is included on this set.
 "Palms of Victory" – recorded in 1978, this track went unreleased until Harris' 2007 compilation album Songbird: Rare Tracks and Forgotten Gems, along with "Softly and Tenderly", which does appear on this set.

Additionally, Parton and Ronstadt both provided harmony vocals on various tracks throughout Harris' 1985 album The Ballad of Sally Rose.

History
Longtime friends and admirers of one another, Parton, Ronstadt and Harris first attempted to record an album together in the mid-1970s, but scheduling conflicts and other difficulties (including the fact that the three women all recorded for different record labels) prevented its release. Finally a collaboration effort went to full fruition, being produced by George Massenburg. When Trio was released in early 1987, it spawned four huge country hit singles – including the country No. 1 remake of the Phil Spector-penned 1958 hit by The Teddy Bears, "To Know Him Is To Love Him". The album hit No. 1 on the U.S. country albums chart – where it held for five consecutive weeks – and No. 6 on the main Billboard album chart. It won the Grammy Award for Best Country Performance by a Duo or Group with Vocal. It was also nominated for the Album of the Year Grammy alongside Michael Jackson, U2, Prince and Whitney Houston, as well as best country song for "Telling Me Lies". It was certified Platinum by the Recording Industry Association of America.

A dozen years after the release of their multi-Platinum, Grammy-winning Trio album, the country music supergroup returned with another in the same vein. Five of the ten tracks on this album first appeared on Linda Ronstadt's 1995 album Feels Like Home, minus Parton's vocals. These five tracks were "Lover's Return", "High Sierra", a cover of Neil Young's "After the Gold Rush" (with Valerie Carter and string arrangements by David Campbell), "The Blue Train" (a Top 40 solo hit for Ronstadt), and the title song to the Ronstadt album, the Randy Newman-composed "Feels Like Home". The Gold-selling album reached the Top Five on Billboards Country Albums chart, as well as No. 62 on Billboards main album listing.

The songs were actually recorded in 1994 by Parton, Ronstadt and Harris, but label disputes and conflicting schedules of the three women prevented its release at the time. Eventually, Ronstadt remixed the five above-mentioned tracks (sans Parton's vocals) to include in Feels Like Home. In 1999 (after Parton and Harris had parted ways with their respective labels), they decided to finally release the album as originally recorded. Though it yielded no hit singles (mainstream U.S. country radio had long since dropped most artists approaching, or over, the age of 50 from their playlists by the late 1990s), Trio II was certified Gold by the RIAA and won the trio another Grammy Award in 2000.

Track listing

 "Softly and Tenderly" was previously released on Harris' 2007 compilation Songbird: Rare Tracks and Forgotten Gems.
 While the album liner notes state "My Blue Tears" is an unreleased recording from 1998, it is actually a recording from 1978 that was originally released on Ronstadt's 1982 album Get Closer.
 "Even Cowgirls Get the Blues" was previously released on Harris' 1977 album Blue Kentucky Girl, however the version included in this set has Ronstadt and Parton sharing the verses with Harris, whereas in the original album they merely sang the harmony.
 "Mr. Sandman" was previously released on Harris' 1981 album Evangeline.

Charts

Weekly charts

Year-end charts

References

2016 compilation albums
Dolly Parton compilation albums
Emmylou Harris compilation albums
Linda Ronstadt compilation albums
Rhino Records compilation albums
Warner Records compilation albums
Asylum Records compilation albums